Ormosciadium is a genus of flowering plants belonging to the family Apiaceae.

Its native range is Western Asia.

Species
Species:
 Ormosciadium aucheri Boiss.

References

Apiaceae
Apiaceae genera